Rezzonico is an Italian habitational surname. It may refer to:

People 

 Carlo della Torre Rezzonico (1693–1769), Venetian Roman Catholic cardinal, later Pope Clement XIII
 Carlo Rezzonico (cardinal) (1724–1799), Clement XIII's nephew and Camerlengo of the Holy Roman Church
 Giovanni Battista Rezzonico (1740–1785), Venetian Roman Catholic cardinal
 Ernesto Torregrossa Rezzonico (born 1992), Venezuelan footballer

Other uses 
 Ca' Rezzonico, a historical building on the Grand Canal of Venice, Italy
 Palazzo Fontana Rezzonico, a historical building on the Grand Canal of Venice, Italy
 Portrait of Abbondio Rezzonico (1766), a painting by Pompeo Batoni
 Santa Maria Rezzonico, a former municipality in Lombardy, Italy
 The Best Independent Producer Award – Premio Raimondo Rezzonico, an award of the Locarno Film Festival for the best independent film producers